The 1928 Idaho gubernatorial election was held on November 6, 1928. Incumbent Republican H. C. Baldridge defeated Democratic nominee C. Ben Ross with 57.82% of the vote.

General election

Candidates
Major party candidates
H. C. Baldridge, Republican 
C. Ben Ross, Democratic

Other candidates
Thomas J. Coonrod, Socialist

Results

References

1928
Idaho
Gubernatorial